Valeriya Goncharova (born 3 January 1988) is a Russian volleyball player.

She played for the Women's National Team at the 2013 FIVB World Grand Prix.

She played for WVC Dynamo Moscow.

Clubs

References

External links 
 Player info CEV
 Player info FIVB
  http://www.russiavolley.com/player/valeriya-goncharova/

1988 births
Living people
Russian women's volleyball players
Universiade bronze medalists for Russia
Universiade medalists in volleyball
Medalists at the 2011 Summer Universiade
20th-century Russian women
21st-century Russian women